Reforms and Freedom was a left-wing coalition of parties for the 2008 general election in San Marino.

Election results and summary 
The electoral coalition won 25 seats out of 60 in the Grand and General Council in the Sammarinese parliamentary election, 2008 gaining 45.78% of the national vote but failed to gain a governmental majority. As a result, the coalition became the opposition to the new government of the right-wing coalition of Pact for San Marino.

After the political crisis of 2011, the alliance was disbanded, the Party of Socialists and Democrats joining their ancient opponents into a government of national unity.

Defunct political party alliances in San Marino